An international flight is a form of commercial flight within civil aviation where the departure and the arrival take place in different countries.

Regular international passenger air service began in August 1919 with a flight going from London, England to Paris, France. The journey was organized and operated by the firm Air Transport & Travel Ltd (AT&T), which would later serve as a forerunner of British Airways (BA). Besides ferrying travelers, the flights, which occurred daily, also transported mail and parcels. The De Havilland DH4A aircraft had gotten designed for combat during the First World War but saw intricate later use. Looking back, historical writer Paul Jarvis has commented that during the "very early days it was very much just about persuading people to fly at all" given that "quite a lot of people" considered aviation as a whole to be "just a passing fad." The aftermath of the Second World War brought out widespread cultural changes in multiple nations that resulted in international flights becoming embraced by large populations.

An important difference between international and domestic flights is that, before boarding the aircraft, passengers must undergo migration formalities and, when arriving to the destination airport, they must undergo both immigration and customs formalities. Exceptions exist in situations such as when the departure and arrival countries are members of the same diplomatically organized free travel area, an example being the Schengen Area within Europe. Said group of traveling agreements is known for the 1985 Schengen Agreement and the 1990 Schengen Convention, both matters of international law being signed in Luxembourg.

Airports serving international flights are known as international airports. For example, King Fahd International Airport within the Dammam metropolis of Saudi Arabia has the largest landmass of any airport in the world, with the complex encompassing over three-hundred square miles of territory. By comparison, the Middle Eastern nation of Bahrain is actually smaller. These international facilities typically are of a far greater size than standard airports, usually including expanded amenities such as areas with bookshops, lounges, and restaurants. Experiences not normally associated with airports such as banks providing financial services may be offered to travelers in such complexes.

Origins

One of the first flights between two countries was on January 7, 1785, when Jean-Pierre Blanchard and John Jeffries crossed the English Channel in a hot air balloon. It took more than a century for the first heavier-than-air object to repeat this process: Louis Blériot crossed the English Channel on July 25, 1909, winning a Daily Mail prize of £1,000.

Aviation technology developed during World War I, with aviation between the World Wars seeing the development of international commercial flights. There was a combination of aircraft types which included airships and airplanes. The first airline to operate international flights was Chalk's Ocean Airways, established 1917, which operated scheduled seaplane services from Florida to the Bahamas. The first regular international service in the world was covered by the British Aircraft Transport and Travel, from Hounslow Heath Aerodrome to Le Bourget, near Paris.

After World War II, international commercial flights were regulated by the creation of the International Air Transport Association (IATA) and the International Civil Aviation Organization (ICAO). Both organizations continue into the 21st century.

See also 

 Airliner
 Bilateral air transport agreement
 Commercial aviation
 Convention on International Civil Aviation
 Domestic flight
 History of air travel
 Non-stop flight
 IATA
 ICAO

References

Civil aviation